Balmoral is an unincorporated settlement in the Shuswap Country region of the Southern Interior of British Columbia, Canada. It is located to the south of Blind Bay on Shuswap Lake and is administered by the Columbia-Shuswap Regional District.

References

Unincorporated settlements in British Columbia
Shuswap Country
Populated places in the Columbia-Shuswap Regional District